Newberry College Historic District is a national historic district located on the campus of Newberry College at Newberry, Newberry County, South Carolina.  The district encompasses four contributing buildings and are Smeltzer Hall (1877), Keller Hall (1895), Holland Hall (1904, designed by Frank Pierce Milburn), and Derrick Hall (1925).  Smeltzer Hall and Keller Hall reflect the Italianate, and  Holland and Derrick Halls reflect the Neo-Classical and Colonial Revival styles. 

It was listed on the National Register of Historic Places in 1976.

References

External links
 

University and college buildings on the National Register of Historic Places in South Carolina
Historic districts on the National Register of Historic Places in South Carolina
Italianate architecture in South Carolina
Colonial Revival architecture in South Carolina
Neoclassical architecture in South Carolina
Historic districts in Newberry County, South Carolina
National Register of Historic Places in Newberry County, South Carolina
Newberry, South Carolina